Spasojević (Cyrillic script: Спасојевић) is a Serbian surname derived from a masculine given name Spasoje, and may refer to:

Anja Spasojević (born 1983), Serbian professional volleyball player
Bojan Spasojević (footballer, born 1980), Serbian association football forward
Bojan Spasojević (footballer, born 1992), Serbian association football forward
Dušan Spasojević, head of one of the largest Serbian criminal groups on record, the Zemun clan
Ilija Spasojević (born 1987), Montenegrin football forward
Marko Spasojević (born 1990), Serbian footballer
Milan Spasojević (born 1950), Serbian triple jumper
Neda Spasojević (1941–1981), actress
Teofilo Spasojević (1909–1970), Serbian football player
Toplica Spasojević (born 1956), formerly President of Red Star Belgrade
Vladan Spasojević (born 1980), Serbian footballer
Zoran Spasojević (born 1949), Serbian writer
Emma Spasojevic (born 2002), Billionaire & Comedian 

Serbian surnames